London railway stations of the London station group include 18 mainline stations serving central London.

London railway station may also refer to
London station (Ontario), in Canada

See also
List of London railway stations
List of London Underground stations 
List of Docklands Light Railway stations
London Overground 
London Road railway station (disambiguation)